Magic is a 2021 Indian Bengali-language psychological thriller film directed by Raja Chanda and produced by Suman Sengupta  starting Ankush Hazra, Oindrila Sen, Payel Sarkar

This film was released under the banner of SSG Entertainment on 12 February 2021.

Synopsis

The story starts with a boy Indra, who is a melancholic state. But he loves magic.  He has some  magical change in his life when he falls in love with a girl Kriti, from his office. After falling in love Indra realises that he had some connection with Kriti in his previous life and the film takes a turn from there.

Cast
 Ankush Hazra as Indra
 Oindrila Sen as Kriti
 Payel Sarkar
 Bidipta Chakraborty

Soundtrack

The background score and the soundtracks are composed by Dabbu and lyrics are penned by Prasenjit Mallik,Raja Chanda And Rajib Dutta.

References

2021 films
Bengali-language Indian films
Films postponed due to the COVID-19 pandemic
Indian psychological thriller films
2020s Bengali-language films
Films directed by Raja Chanda
2021 psychological thriller films